Lamb-Ferebee House is a historic home located near Camden, Camden County, North Carolina. It was built about 1825, and is a two-story, double-pile, nearly square frame Federal style dwelling. It has a gable roof and one-story shed-roof porch.

It was listed on the National Register of Historic Places in 1980.

References

Houses on the National Register of Historic Places in North Carolina
Federal architecture in North Carolina
Houses completed in 1825
Houses in Camden County, North Carolina
National Register of Historic Places in Camden County, North Carolina